Olivier Lombard (born 25 April 1991 in Poissy) is a French racing driver, racing in the FIA World Endurance Championship for Signatech-Nissan.

Career
After karting from 2004 to 2008, Olivier Lombard began racing cars in 2009 when he contested the Formula BMW Europe series. Driving for the EuroInternational team, he finished 16th overall and fourth best rookie, with a best result of fifth at the final race of the season at Monza. He also contested two rounds of the 2009 Formula BMW Americas season with EuroInternational, at Virginia and Road America.

In 2010 Olivier Lombard switched to sportscars, contesting the final three rounds of the Le Mans Series in the Formula Le Mans category with Hope Polevision Racing. After the car failed to finish at his first race, he finished third in the FLM class at the Hungaroring and second at Silverstone.

After contesting the 2011 12 Hours of Sebring and 1000 km of Spa in the FLM car, he signed with Greaves Motorsport to contest the 24 Hours of Le Mans and the remainder of the Le Mans Series with the team in its LMP2 class Zytek-Nissan. Olivier Lombard and Greaves went on to win the LMP2 class at Le Mans, finishing eighth overall. They also won the Le Mans Series rounds at Imola and Silverstone, helping Greaves to win the LMP2 title.

Olivier Lombard contested the 2012 FIA World Endurance Championship season for Signatech-Nissan in LMP2, together with fellow French drivers Franck Mailleux and Jordan Tresson.

24 Hours of Le Mans results

References

External links

1991 births
Living people
People from Poissy
French racing drivers
European Le Mans Series drivers
American Le Mans Series drivers
24 Hours of Le Mans drivers
FIA World Endurance Championship drivers
Sportspeople from Yvelines
Formula BMW Europe drivers
Formula BMW USA drivers
Signature Team drivers
EuroInternational drivers
Sébastien Loeb Racing drivers
Morand Racing drivers
Greaves Motorsport drivers
Le Mans Cup drivers